Tut Ruach (born April 30, 1985) is a Canadian former basketball player. Starting his professional career in 2009, he was named NBL Canada All-Star in 2012. Ruach played college basketball for York University and competed for Father Michael Goetz Secondary School in his previous seasons. He left York as its all-time leading scorer. His family was originally from South Sudan.

Professional career 
On March 13, 2015, Ruach broke the NBL Canada single-game record for most points, recording 48 in a postseason meeting with the Windsor Express.

References 

1985 births
Living people
Basketball people from Nova Scotia
Canadian men's basketball players
Canadian people of South Sudanese descent
Canadian sportspeople of African descent
Sportspeople of South Sudanese descent
Itzehoe Eagles players
Mississauga Power players
Oshawa Power players
Point guards
Sportspeople from Halifax, Nova Scotia
York University alumni